František Čapek (24 October 1914 – 31 January 2008) was a Czechoslovakian sprint canoeist who competed from the late 1940s to the mid-1950s. He won a gold medal in the C-1 10000 m event at the 1948 Summer Olympics in London.

Born in Branice, Písek District, he also won a silver medal at the 1954 ICF Canoe Sprint World Championships in Mâcon in the C-1 10000 m event.

References
DatabaseOlympics.com profile

1914 births
2008 deaths
Canoeists at the 1948 Summer Olympics
Czech male canoeists
Czechoslovak male canoeists
Olympic canoeists of Czechoslovakia
Olympic gold medalists for Czechoslovakia
Olympic medalists in canoeing
ICF Canoe Sprint World Championships medalists in Canadian

Medalists at the 1948 Summer Olympics